Alexander Ray DeJohn (born May 10, 1991) is an American professional soccer player who plays as a defender. Born in Marlboro, New Jersey, DeJohn played college soccer for the Old Dominion Monarchs before being drafted in the 2013 MLS Supplemental Draft by the New England Revolution as the 42nd pick (80th overall). Despite being drafted, DeJohn moved to Finland and joined Ekenäs IF before moving to Veikkausliiga club TPS.

DeJohn spent two seasons in Finland before moving to Norway with Start. He then moved to Sweden and signed with Dalkurd. In 2019, DeJohn moved back to the United States and signed with Orlando City where he played two seasons.

Early life and college
Born in Marlboro, New Jersey, DeJohn began his career with the Players Development Academy, where he played with the PDA Cruyff side. In 2009, DeJohn entered Old Dominion University where he played college soccer for the Old Dominion Monarchs. He played with the Monarchs for four years, playing 66 games and scoring 2 goals. Following the 2012 season, DeJohn was named into the second team CAA All-Conference squad.

Career
While playing college soccer for the Old Dominion Monarchs, DeJohn spent the summer of 2011 playing with the Central Jersey Spartans of the Premier Development League.

Ekenäs IF and TPS
On January 22, 2013, DeJohn was selected by the New England Revolution with the 42nd pick in the MLS Supplemental Draft (80th overall in the MLS SuperDraft). Later in 2013, DeJohn moved to Finland and joined Kakkonen (third division) club Ekenäs IF. He made his debut for the club on April 28, 2013, against Gnistan, starting in the 4–1 defeat. He scored his first goal for the club on May 25 against LPS, finding the net in the 3–0 victory.

Following his first season in Finland, DeJohn signed with Veikkausliiga (first division) club TPS. He made his debut for TPS on January 24, 2014, against Inter Turku, starting in a 3–2 defeat. He scored his goal for the club on February 19 against Mariehamn, scoring the opener in a 2–2 draw.

Start and Dalkurd
Following his two seasons in Finland, DeJohn moved to Norway and signed with Eliteserien club Start. He made his club debut on April 7, 2015, against Lillestrøm, starting as the match ended in a 1–1 draw.

DeJohn stayed with Start for two seasons before moving to Sweden and signing with Superettan club Dalkurd. His debut for Dalkurd was on March 5, 2017, against AIK. He started as the match ended in a 0–0 draw. During the 2017 season, DeJohn helped Dalkurd finish in second place and earn promotion to the Allsvenskan. DeJohn scored his first goals in the Swedish top tier on August 27, 2018, against Hammarby, a brace during a 3–2 defeat.

Orlando City
On January 10, 2019, DeJohn returned to the United States and joined Major League Soccer club Orlando City. He made his debut on March 2 against New York City FC, starting in the 2–2 draw. Following his first season with Orlando, DeJohn had his contract option declined before re-signing with the club on November 27, 2019.

On December 2, 2020, following the 2020 season, DeJohn had his contract declined again and was thus released.

Atlanta United
On February 9, 2021, DeJohn joined USL Championship club Pittsburgh Riverhounds. However, a month later, on March 12, DeJohn signed with Major League Soccer side Atlanta United. According to Riverhounds head coach Bob Lilley, the club had an agreement with DeJohn that he could terminate his contract if he receives and accepts an opportunity with a club in Major League Soccer. On May 1, 2021, DeJohn appeared for Atlanta United 2, the club's reserve affiliate in the USL Championship, against OKC Energy. He then made his debut for Atlanta United on May 9, 2021, in a 1–1 draw against Inter Miami, coming on as a 73rd-minute substitute. DeJohn's contract option was declined by Atlanta following the 2022 season.

Career statistics

References

External links
 Profile at Atlanta United

1991 births
Living people
People from Marlboro Township, New Jersey
Sportspeople from Monmouth County, New Jersey
American soccer players
Association football defenders
Old Dominion Monarchs men's soccer players
Central Jersey Spartans players
Ekenäs IF players
Turun Palloseura footballers
IK Start players
Dalkurd FF players
Orlando City SC players
Pittsburgh Riverhounds SC players
Atlanta United FC players
Atlanta United 2 players
USL League Two players
Kakkonen players
Veikkausliiga players
Eliteserien players
Superettan players
Allsvenskan players
Major League Soccer players
USL Championship players
Soccer players from New Jersey
New England Revolution draft picks
American expatriate soccer players
American expatriate sportspeople in Finland
Expatriate footballers in Finland
American expatriate sportspeople in Norway
Expatriate footballers in Norway
American expatriate sportspeople in Sweden
Expatriate footballers in Sweden